Andre Begemann and Andrea Vavassori were the defending champions but chose not to defend their title.

Ruben Bemelmans and Daniel Masur won the title after defeating Jérôme Kym and Leandro Riedi 6–4, 6–7(5–7), [10–7] in the final.

Seeds

Draw

References

External links
 Main draw

Challenger Città di Lugano - Doubles